Turgut Kabaca (August 10, 1972, İstanbul) civil engineer, swimmer and national water polo player.

Career 

 1979-1985 Galatasaray Swimming Team
 1986-2005 Galatasaray Water Polo Team (1993-2002 Captain of  Senior Team, 1991,1993,1994,1995,1996,1997,1999,2000,2001,2005, 10 times Senior Team Turkish Champion )
 1988-1992 Junior National Team Player
 1990-2002 Senior National Team Player
 2005-2008 Board Member of the Turkish Water Polo Federation, Manager of  National Teams 
 2008-2009 ODTÜ Sutopu Takımı (1.lig) 
 2008-2009 METU Water Polo Team (1st league)
 2010-2014 Antalyaspor Water Polo Team ( 3rd league champion, 2nd league champion  and 1st league)  
 2013 Galatasaray 35+ Masters Team (European Masters Water Polo Championship - Budapest, Silver Medal )
 2014- 2015 Manisa Metyx Water Polo Team (1st league)

References

Results 35FINAL.pdf

External links

Living people
1972 births
Engineers from Istanbul
Turkish civil engineers
Turkish male water polo players
Sportspeople from Istanbul